Hutten-Czapski (feminine: Hutten-Czapska) a Polish surname. It belongs to Polish noble  of counts  of Leliwa coat of arms heraldic clan .

The surname may refer to:

Emeryk Hutten-Czapski (1828-1896), Polish Count, scholar, ardent historical collector and numismatist
Emeryk August Hutten-Czapski (1897-1979), Polish Count, politician, military officer, diplomat and Bailiff of the Polish Sovereign Military Order of Malta
Karol Hutten-Czapski (1860-1904), Polish philanthropist, Mayor of Minsk
Stanisław Hutten-Czapski (1779-1844), Polish Count and Colonel in the Napoleonic wars
Alexandrina Hutten-Czapska, spouse of Louis IV, Grand Duke of Hesse
Maria Czapska (1894-1981), Polish author, essayist, historian, actually countess Hutten-Czapska 
Józef Czapski (1896-1993) Polish artist, author, and critic, as well as an officer of the Polish Army,  actually count Hutten-Czapski

See also
Czapski
Czapski family

Polish-language surnames
Compound surnames